Marouane Sahraoui (born 9 January 1996) is a French-born Tunisian football player who plays for Ismaily SC. He also holds French citizenship.

Club career
He made his professional debut in the Belgian First Division B for RFC Seraing on 26 September 2015 in a game against Dessel.

International
He represented Tunisia at the 2013 FIFA U-17 World Cup. He was called up to the main Tunisia national football team on one occasion in 2016, but is yet to make his on-field debut.

References

1996 births
Footballers from Marseille
French sportspeople of Tunisian descent
Living people
Tunisian footballers
Espérance Sportive de Tunis players
R.F.C. Seraing (1922) players
Tunisian expatriate footballers
Expatriate footballers in Belgium
Challenger Pro League players
Vitória S.C. B players
Expatriate footballers in Portugal
Liga Portugal 2 players
Association football defenders
Tunisian expatriate sportspeople in Belgium
Tunisian expatriate sportspeople in Portugal